Artur Francuz (10 November 1971 – 10 April 2010) was a Polish officer of Government Protection Bureau.

He died in the 2010 Polish Air Force Tu-154 crash near Smolensk on 10 April 2010. He was posthumously awarded the Order of Polonia Restituta.

References

1971 births
2010 deaths
Knights of the Order of Polonia Restituta
Victims of the Smolensk air disaster